Lindö FF is a Swedish football club located in Norrköping.

Background
Lindö FF currently plays in Division 4 Östergötland Östra which is the sixth tier of Swedish football. They play their home matches at the City Gross arena in Norrköping.

The club is affiliated to Östergötlands Fotbollförbund. Lindö FF played in the 2008 Svenska Cupen but lost 0–4 at home to Syrianska FC in the first round.

Season to season

Footnotes

External links
 Lindö FF – Official website
 Lindö FF on Facebook

Football clubs in Östergötland County
Association football clubs established in 1972
1972 establishments in Sweden